Meatus acusticus can refer to:
 Ear canal (meatus acusticus externus)
 Internal auditory meatus (meatus acusticus internus)